Igor Viktorovich Perminov (born 13 April 1975) is a former Russian football player.

References

1975 births
Living people
Soviet footballers
Russian footballers
FC Luch Vladivostok players
Russian Premier League players
FC Oryol players
FC Tyumen players
Association football defenders
FC Zhemchuzhina Sochi players
FC Sibir Novosibirsk players